Edward Wilcox or Wilcocks may refer to:

Eddie Wilcox (1907–1968), American jazz pianist and arranger
Edward A. Wilcox (1830–1910), American physician and politician
Edward Walton Wilcox, American painter and sculptor
Edward Wilcocks, MP for New Romney
Edward Wilcox, List of lieutenant governors of Rhode Island